Roy Thompson (born 1946) is a Northern Irish politician, initially with the Democratic Unionist Party (DUP) and later with the Ulster Unionist Party (UUP).

A dairy farmer by profession Thompson was involved in politics from an early age and was a founder member of the DUP, serving on the new party's executive. He was elected to Antrim Borough Council in the 1981 elections and the following year was elected to the Northern Ireland Assembly for South Antrim. Whilst serving as deputy mayor of Antrim in 1992 he resigned from the DUP for unknown reasons, although he stated publicly that his decision had nothing to do with Ian Paisley's leadership.

Thompson has subsequently changed political allegiance on a number of occasions. In the 1993 local elections he was returned to Antrim Council as an Independent Unionist before in 1997 retaining the seat as a UUP member. He remained a councillor until 2005 when he was defeated, having returned to the DUP. Once again representing the DUP Thompson was re-elected to the council in 2011.
Roy Thompson was convicted of subsidy fraud in November 2003.

References

1946 births
Living people
Democratic Unionist Party politicians
Ulster Unionist Party councillors
Northern Ireland MPAs 1982–1986
Members of Antrim Borough Council
Farmers from Northern Ireland